The Journal of Systematics and Evolution is a bimonthly peer-reviewed scientific journal of botany. It covers all issues related to plant systematics and evolution. It is published by Wiley on behalf of the Botanical Society of China and is sponsored by the Institute of Botany (Chinese Academy of Sciences). The editors-in-chief are Song Ge (Chinese Academy of Sciences) and Jun Wen (Smithsonian Institution). The journal was established in 1963 as Acta Phytotaxonomica Sinica.

Abstracting and indexing
The journal is abstracted and indexed in:
Biological Abstracts
BIOSIS Previews 
CAB Abstracts
Current Contents/Agriculture, Biology & Environmental Sciences
EBSCO databases
Science Citation Index Expanded
Scopus
The Zoological Record

According to the Journal Citation Reports, the journal has a 2020 impact factor of 4.098.

References

External links

Wiley (publisher) academic journals
Chinese Academy of Sciences
Bimonthly journals
English-language journals
Publications established in 1963
Botany journals